Saddleback Point is a headland on the northern coast of Elephant Island, in the South Shetland Islands of Antarctica.

Ecological significance
A 65 ha tract of ice-free land at the point has been identified as an Important Bird Area by BirdLife International because it supports a large breeding colony of about 10,000 pairs of chinstrap penguins.

References

Important Bird Areas of Antarctica
Penguin colonies
Headlands of the South Shetland Islands
Elephant Island